The 1954–55 Beitar Tel Aviv season was the club's 22nd season since its establishment, in 1934, and 7th since the establishment of the State of Israel.

During the season, the club competed in Liga Alef (top division) and the State Cup. In addition, the club played in the privately organized Shapira Cup, a four-club league competition.

Review and events
 At the beginning of the season, top Beitar teams, Beitar Tel Aviv and Beitar Jerusalem competed for the Lifa Livyatan Memorial Cup, named after a late Beitar journalist. In the first match, played on 28 August 1954, the teams tied 3–3, and the match was replayed on 12 October 1954, Beitar Tel Aviv winning 5–2.
 During December 1954 and January 1955, as no league matches were played due to a dispute between Hapoel, Maccabi and Beitar factions in the IFA, Hapoel Tel Aviv organized a league competition for the top Tel Aviv teams, Hapoel, Maccabi, Beitar and Maccabi Jaffa. The competition was played as a double round-robin tournament, with the top placed team winning the cup, named after former Hapoel Tel Aviv treasurer, Yosef Shapira. The club won two matches and lost four, finishing third.
 The club played one international friendly match during the season, against AC Omonia, on 31 May1955, winning 4–2.

Match results

Legend

Liga Alef
 
League matches began on 6 February 1955, and by the time the season, only 20 rounds of matches were completed, delaying the end of the league season to the next season.

League table (as of 2 July 1955)

Matches

Results by match

State Cup

Shapira Cup

League table

Results

References

Beitar Tel Aviv F.C. seasons
Beitar Tel Aviv